Kim Young-hee (17 May 1963 – 31 January 2023) was a South Korean basketball player who competed in the 1984 Summer Olympics. Born in Ulsan, Gyeongsangnam-do, Kim was the elder of two children, with a younger brother.

Kim died of brain cancer on 31 January 2023, at the age of 59.

References

1963 births
2023 deaths
South Korean women's basketball players
Sportspeople from Ulsan
Basketball players at the 1984 Summer Olympics
Medalists at the 1984 Summer Olympics
Olympic basketball players of South Korea
Olympic silver medalists for South Korea
Olympic medalists in basketball
Basketball players at the 1982 Asian Games
Basketball players at the 1986 Asian Games
Asian Games medalists in basketball
Asian Games silver medalists for South Korea
Medalists at the 1982 Asian Games
Medalists at the 1986 Asian Games
20th-century South Korean women
Deaths from brain tumor